The Hellenic Football Federation (HFF), also known as the Greek Football Federation is the governing body of football in Greece. It contributes in the organisation of Superleague Greece and organizes the Greek Cup and the Greece national team. It is based in Athens.

History

The Hellenic Football Federation (HFF) was founded on 14 November 1926 by a decision of the three major Unions of the country: Athens, Piraeus and Thessalonica. Its foundation marked the organization of Greek football in compliance with international standards. Since then, the HFF has grown into the biggest sports federation in Greece, as football in the country is regarded as the "king of sports" coming first in the preferences of sports fans.

The HFF is considered a private legal entity and a non-profit organization with registered offices in Athens. It is the only exclusively qualified body in Greece to represent the interests of Greek football and prohibits any political, religious or racial discrimination.

In 1927, the HFF became a member of FIFA and in 1954 became one of the first members of UEFA. Amongst its obligations as member of international sports bodies, the HFF accepts the statutes, regulations, directives and decisions issued by FIFA and UEFA. The HFF also has to ensure that they are accepted by all individuals and clubs in Greek football.

On 3 July 2006, FIFA ruled the HFF was failing to adhere to the principles of the FIFA statutes regarding FIFA's political independence. Accordingly, the HFF was indefinitely suspended from international football. In response, Greek officials proposed a change in FIFA's law. However, FIFA ruled it too constituted an interference of the government in matters that should be under the football federation's jurisdiction. As such, FIFA concluded Greece would not be able to meet its 15 July 2006 deadline and should therefore be suspended until further notice. The suspension would have meant Greek clubs would not be allowed to participate in international competitions, and that the Greece national team would not be able to participate in international matches. There were also doubts cast over whether the 2007 UEFA Champions League Final will be played at Athens' Olympic Stadium as previously scheduled.

However, on 7 July 2006, the Greek government ratified a new version of the sports law, granting the HFF independence and therefore adherence to FIFA's laws. FIFA announced the lifting of its ban that day, judging that the amendments adhered to FIFA and UEFA statutes. This allowed Greece to participate in UEFA Euro 2008 and also allowed Greek clubs to participate in European competitions.

On 11 December 2008, HFF president Vassilis Gagatsis resigned from his position after an eight-year tenure. New elections were held on 17 January 2009, making Giorgos Sarris the new president. However, Sarris' election was controversial, with reports claiming the election was not fair and that Olympiacos owner Evangelos Marinakis had allegedly using his power to help appoint Sarris.

In April 2013, the HFF announced its new partnership with Nike, which also became the official supplier of clothes and equipment for the Greece national team. On the eve of the announcement, Giorgos Sarris praised the new partnership hoping that "it will contribute to the overall advancement of domestic football".

Milestones
 1926: Foundation of the Hellenic Football Federation
 1927: The Hellenic Football Federation becomes a member of FIFA
 1954: The Hellenic Football Federation becomes one of the founding members of UEFA
 2004: The Greece national team wins UEFA Euro 2004

Historic events
The HFF has organised major football events with success. The most important "moments", as to the participating clubs, are:

 1971: European Cup Winners' Cup final, Chelsea–Real Madrid (1–0)
 1973: European Cup Winners' Cup final, A.C. Milan–Leeds United (1–0)
 1983: European Cup final Hamburger SV–Juventus (1–0)
 1987: European Cup Winners' Cup final, Lokomotive Leipzig–Ajax (0–1)
 1994: Champions League final, Milan–Barcelona (4–0)
 2007: Champions League final, Milan–Liverpool (2–1)

Organisation

Organisational structure
The structure of the HFF is pyramid shaped. It is based on 2,000,000 football players and 5,773 football clubs, 3,700 from which are actively participating in official competitions of every kind, which take place throughout the country, covering all ages. The clubs come under the 53 Regional Unions of Football Clubs. The professional competitions are being organized by the Professional League (Greek League). The HFF is the supreme football authority, the one that all the clubs and professional teams come under and forms the top of the pyramid.

The General Assembly, convening once a year, is actually the HFF parliament. It is the Assembly that, according to the Statutes, decides on everything about Greek football. They can change the Statutes and the regulations of the Federation, enforce new ones, audit the financial review for the previous fiscal year and the budget for the year to come, vote (every four years) and monitor the Administration's work.

Divisions
The divisions of H.F.F. are: The Sporting Division, the Management Division, the Finance and Marketing Division, the International Relations Division, and the Press and Mass Media Division.

Committees
The operation of H.F.F. relies on the above-mentioned divisions that function on the responsibility of their respective managers, as much as, the Committees of the Executive Board, which, according to the Statutes of the Federation, are the following:

 The Disciplinary Committee (first and second instance)
 The Appeal Committee
 The Financial Dispute Resolution Committee (second instance)
 The Central Referee's Committee, which comprises three members and controls the entire referee field in Greece
 The Players' Status-Transfer Committee

Standing Committees
 Regulations Committee
 International Relations Committee
 Technical Committee
 Greek Cup Committee
 Procurements Committee
 Divisions Committee
 Selections Team Committee
 Mass Media and Public Relations Committee
 Legal Matters Committee
 Violence Committee
 Medical Committee
 International Amateur Football Committee
 Amateur Football Committee
 Licensing Committee
 Football Managers Committee
 Training Board
 Futsal (indoor football) Committee
 Finance Committee
 Statistics and Stadium Committee
 Youth Amateur Football Committee
 Women's Football Committee

The H.F.F. is responsible for doping control in all the Greek championships.

Honours

Men's National Team
 UEFA European Championship
 Winners (1): 2004

Men's U-21
 UEFA European Under-21 Championship
 Runners-up (2): 1988, 1998

Men's U-19
 UEFA European Under-19 Championship
 Runners-up (2): 2007, 2012

HFF presidents
Below are the presidents of HFF:

Controversies

Koriopolis 

The incident first came to light after UEFA issued a report, which drew attention to 40 matches that were rigged in Greek football in the 2009–10 season. The initial probe into the incident involved approximately 80 individuals suspected of wrongdoing. Olympiacos owner Evangelos Marinakis was also accused of using his position in Greek football and special relationship with the president of the HFF, to appoint favorable referees to matches. Marinakis was later acquitted from all charges by the Prosecutor and the Council of Judges and the decision is final.

In February 2012, the Superleague Greece, with the agreement of the HFF, replaced the two football prosecutors (Fakos and Antonakakis) with two others (Petropoulos and Karras).

2015 Greek football scandal 
The 2015 Greek football scandal emerged on 6 April 2015 when prosecutor Aristidis Korreas' 173-page work was revealed. Telephone tapping operated by the National Intelligence Service of Greece since 2011 has played a significant role in the case. According to the prosecutor's conclusion, Olympiacos owner Evangelos Marinakis along with HFF members Theodoros Kouridis and Georgios Sarris, were suspected of directing a criminal organization since 2011. The goal behind their scheme was allegedly to "absolutely control Greek football's fate by the methods of blackmailing and fraud", exploiting the self-governing ("autonomy") status of national football federations promoted by FIFA and UEFA. In 2016, a temporary administration was placed by FIFA.
On 28 December 2017 a new president was elected Evangelos Grammenos with the support of Savvidis and Melissanidis .

On 28 January 2021, the three-member Criminal Court of Appeals  acquitted the leader of Olympiacos, Vangelis Marinakis, of all the charges against him in the trial of 28. The same happened with all the defendants in the case. After a thorough analysis of all the elements of the investigation, from the testimony of the witnesses (and the contradictions they encountered) and from the rejection of the pre-investigation conclusion by the lawyers of the accused, the court decided to reject all the accusations.
A case that lasted almost six years and occupied Greek football, tarnishing reputations, has now been closed definitively and irrevocably.

Other
The HFF has also been subject to allegations of other crimes, including blackmail and tax evasion. In November 2013, a team of prosecutors raided the headquarters of the HFF to find evidence of illegal activity. There have been allegations some of the teams have failed to pay their taxes by submitting fake documents.

Since 2015, the HFF has also been under judicial investigation regarding the existence of a "pyramid's economic scheme" in the Greek referees' society.

Giorgos Girzikis, ex-president of the HFF, is also under penal prosecution for three felony economic crimes.

In March 2019, the ex-presidents of HFF, Vasilis Gagatsis, Sofoklis Pilavios and Giorgos Girtzikis were found guilty by the Greek courts for economic crimes.

References

External links
Official Site
Greece at FIFA site
Greece at UEFA site

Greece
 
Futsal in Greece
Foo
1926 establishments in Greece
Sports organizations established in 1926
Crime in Greece
Corruption in Greece